English Harbour may refer to:
English Harbour, Antigua
English Harbour, Newfoundland and Labrador
English Harbour East, Newfoundland and Labrador
English Harbour West, Newfoundland and Labrador
Paelau, Kiribati, formerly known as English Harbour

See also
English Bay (disambiguation)